Rachel Roberts (born April 8, 1978) is a Canadian model and actress. Roberts has appeared in numerous ad campaigns, most notably for Biotherm Skin Care Products, and she became well known in the United States as the title character in the film Simone.

Career
Roberts was born in Vancouver, British Columbia, Canada. When she began modeling, she began to work for magazines such as Elle, Vogue, Harper's Bazaar, Glamour, Marie Claire and the Sports Illustrated Swimsuit Issue of 2000, Victoria's Secret Country 1998, 1999 and Victoria's Secret lookbook 2000, 2001.

Signing on to be skin-care line Biotherm's official model, she gained even more popularity by posing in campaigns for labels such as Ralph Lauren, Gap, Bottega Veneta, Ferre, Sisley, and Victoria's Secret. She has walked for countless designers such as Chloé, Valentino, Givenchy, Fendi, Blumarine, Roberto Cavalli, Comme des Garçons, Paul Smith and Balmain. She also was seen in the European advertisements of Nivea.

Acting career
Roberts made her film debut as the title character of the movie Simone in 2002 performing opposite Al Pacino. The studio attempted to keep her identity a secret during production, and did not accord her credit in the initial theatrical release, in an effort to maintain the illusion that her character was a virtual computer-created entity. After release her identity became known and she received credit in the video release. She later married Andrew Niccol, who wrote, produced and directed the film. They have two children: son Jack and daughter Ava.

She has guest-starred on such television series as Entourage, Ugly Betty and Numbers. She was given a recurring role on the ABC one-hour drama FlashForward. In 2011, she played Carrera in the movie In Time opposite Justin Timberlake and Amanda Seyfried. She appeared in the series CSI: Crime Scene Investigation as Karen Chevera in the episode "Unplugged" (2012). She played Soul Fleur in the 2013 movie The Host. Roberts appeared on Mad Men opposite Jon Hamm in the episode "Tale of Two Cities". She starred in Rihanna's music video "Bitch Better Have My Money" which was released on July 2, 2015. She was cast as Cassandra in Andrew Niccol's sci-fi thriller film Anon. She also portrayed Sharon Tate in the tenth episode of American Horror Story: Cult.

Filmography

Film

Television

Music videos

Agencies
Liz Bell, Vancouver (mother agency)
MODELS 1 London
ONE MANAGEMENT New York
NEXT Los Angeles
D MANAGEMENT Milan
VIEW Spain
ICONIC Berlin

References

External links

1978 births
Living people
Actresses from Vancouver
Female models from British Columbia
Canadian television actresses
Canadian film actresses
21st-century Canadian actresses